Talapus Lake is a freshwater lake located on a prominent valley at the eastern skirt of Bandera Mountain, in King County, Washington. Mount Defiance and Pratt Mountain are a short distance to the west of Talapus Lake. The name Talapus is a Chinook word for coyote.

Talapus Lake is surrounded by other alpine lakes, including Olallie Lake and Pratt Lake a short distance north. Because of its proximity to Snoqualmie Pass and other prominent peaks in the Alpine Lakes Wilderness, the lake is a popular area for hiking, swimming, and fishing rainbow trout. 

Access to the lake is from Talapus Lake trail or Pratt Lake trail further east, a short exit from Interstate 90, west of the Snoqualmie Pass.

See also 
 List of lakes of the Alpine Lakes Wilderness

References 

Lakes of King County, Washington
Lakes of the Alpine Lakes Wilderness
Okanogan National Forest